Taipei 101/World Trade Center is a metro station in Taipei, Taiwan served by Taipei Metro.

Station overview

The station is situated under Xinyi Road, near Shifu Road. The two-level, underground station structure with one island platform and five exits. The northeast exit directly connects to the basement of Taipei 101.

Originally, the station was to be named just "World Trade Center". However, since both Taipei 101 and the Taipei World Trade Center represent national landmarks, on 22 July 2011, the Department of Rapid Transit Systems announced that the station would be renamed to Taipei 101/World Trade Center.

Construction
The station has a -long crossover section. It has five entrances, three elevators for the disabled and two vent shafts.

Public Art
The theme for this station is "Modern melody - creation of a spatial atmosphere for dialoguing with the world". The district represents an international exchange between Taiwan and the world. Public art will represent the rapid broadcast of information and the crowd's busy interaction.

Station layout

Notable landmarks
Taipei 101 (exit 4)
Taipei World Trade Center (exit 1)
Taipei World Trade Center International Trade Building
Taipei International Convention Center
Grand Hyatt Taipei
Taipei Medical University
Xinyi Sports Center
Xinyi Elementary School (exit 3)

First and last train timing 
The first and last train timing at Taipei 101/World Trade Center station  is as follows:

References

Railway stations opened in 2013
Tamsui–Xinyi line stations
Xinyi Special District